Daniele Vicari (born 26 February 1967) is an Italian director, screenwriter and producer.

Life and career 
Born in Collegiove, Province of Rieti, Vicari graduated from Rome's University La Sapienza in History and Critics of Cinema under Guido Aristarco. Between 1990 and 1999 he was a film critic for the magazines Cinema Nuovo and Cinema 60, and in the same period he filmed his first shorts.

After shooting several documentary films, in 2002 Vicari made his feature film debut with the drama Maximum Velocity (V-Max), which was entered into the competition at the 59th edition of the Venice International Film Festival and got him a David di Donatello for best new director. His 2006 film My Country won a David di Donatello for best documentary film.

Filmography 

 Maximum Velocity (V-Max) (2002)
  The Horizon of Events (2005) 
  My Country (2006) 
  The Past Is a Foreign Land (2006) 
 Diaz – Don't Clean Up This Blood (2012) 
 Anija. The Ship (2012)
 Sole cuore amore (2016)
 Prima che la notte (2018)
 Il giorno e la notte (2021)

References

External links 
 

1967 births
Living people
Italian film directors
Italian television directors
Italian screenwriters
Italian male screenwriters
People from the Province of Rieti
20th-century Italian people
Nastro d'Argento winners
David di Donatello winners
Ciak d'oro winners
Italian documentary film directors